The Coronet Cluster, also known as the R CrA cluster after its best-known member, is a small open cluster located about 170 parsecs away in the southern constellation Corona Australis, isolated at the edge of the Gould Belt. The Coronet Cluster is 3.5 times closer to the Earth than the Orion Nebula Cluster. The cluster center is composed of mostly young stars. The variable T Coronae Australis is also a member, only one arc minute from R CrA.

References

External links

Gould Belt
Open clusters
Corona Australis
NGC objects